Cellana eucosmia is a species of limpet, a marine gastropod mollusc in the family Nacellidae.

Distribution
This species occurs in the Red Sea and in the Indian Ocean off Tanzania.

References

 Spry, J.F. (1961). The sea shells of Dar es Salaam: Gastropods. Tanganyika Notes and Records 56 
 Nakano & Ozawa (2007). Worldwide phylogeography of limpets of the order Patellogastropoda: Molecular, morphological and palaeontological evidence. Journal of Molluscan Studies 73(1) 79-99.

Nacellidae